Lochau-Hörbranz railway station is a railway station in the municipality of Lochau, in the Austrian state of Vorarlberg. It is an intermediate stop on the standard gauge Vorarlberg line of Austrian Federal Railways (ÖBB). The station is served by ÖBB regional and Vorarlberg S-Bahn trains.

Services 
The following services stop at Lochau-Hörbranz:

 Vorarlberg S-Bahn: : half-hourly service to Bludenz and less than hourly service to Lindau Hauptbahnhof.

References

External links 
 
 
Vorarlberg S-Bahn stations
Railway stations in Vorarlberg